The 1970 Singaporean presidential election was held to elect the next president of Singapore.Benjamin Sheares as the winning candidate re-elected by the Parliament of Singapore.

Results
The election took place during a sitting of Parliament on 30 December 1970 where 54 members were present and 4 members were absent.

Prime Minister Lee Kuan Yew nominated Benjamin Sheares as president. The Parliament unanimously voted to elect Sheares as president.

Sheares was sworn in for his first four-year term as president on 2 January 1971.

References

Presidential elections in Singapore
Singapore
Presidential election